The  is a railway line in Japan, owned by the private railway operator Chichibu Railway, linking  and , both in Saitama Prefecture.

Stations 

Legend
 ● - All trains stop
 ○ - Some trains stop
 ▲ - Some trains pass
 ▼ - Trains make seasonal stops
| - All trains pass

Rolling stock
, the Chichibu Railway operates the following fleet of rolling stock on the line.

 5000 series 3-car EMUs x3 (formerly Toei 6000 series) (since 1999)
 6000 series 3-car EMUs x3 (formerly Seibu 101 series) (since March 2006)
 7000 series 3-car EMUs x2 (formerly Tokyu 8500 series) (since March 2009)
 7500 series 3-car EMUs x7 (formerly Tokyu 8090 series) (since March 2010)
 7800 series 2-car EMUs x4 (formerly Tokyu 8090 series) (since 16 March 2013)
 Class C58 steam locomotive (No. C58 363 for Paleo Express)
 Four 12 series passenger coaches for Paleo Express (OHaFu 12-101 and 102, OHa 12-111 and 112)
 DeKi 100 electric locomotives (x6)
 DeKi 200 electric locomotive (x1)
 DeKi 300 electric locomotives (x3)
 DeKi 500 electric locomotives (x7)

Rolling stock previously used
 300 series 2-car EMUs (from 1959 until October 1992)
 500 series 2-car EMUs (from 1957 until March 1992)
 800 series 2-car EMUs (formerly Odakyu 1800 series) (from 1979 until 1990)
 1000 series 3-car EMUs (formerly JNR 101 series) (from 1986 until March 2014)
 2000 series 4-car EMUs (formerly Tokyu 7000 series) (from 1991 until 2000)
 3000 series 3-car EMUs x3 (formerly JR East 165 series) (from 1992 until December 2006)
 43 series passenger coaches (for Paleo Express)

History 
The line was extended in stages, reaching Chichibu in 1914. The line was electrified at 1,200 V DC on 15 March 1918. On 1 August 1922, the Chichibu Railway acquired the  operating between Hanyū and Kumagaya. The line reached Mitsumineguchi in 1930.

From 1 February 1952, The line voltage was raised to 1,500 V DC.

Former connecting lines
 Kumagaya Station: The Tobu Kumagaya Line operated between 1943 and 1983.

References

External links

  

Railway lines in Japan
Rail transport in Saitama Prefecture
1067 mm gauge railways in Japan
Chichibu Railway
Railway lines opened in 1901
1901 establishments in Japan